Jaya Ganesh Isuran (born 3 July 1988) also known as Jaynesh , is a Singaporean Tamil television actor, radio jockey and television host. He was well known for his unique hosting in Hello V Live on Vannathirai, Hello Vasantham and acting as one of the main role as a police officer of Secret Society Branch ASP Raghav in the crime drama Vettai Season 2. He was a former radio jockey in the Singaporean Tamil radio station Oli 96.8FM.

Personal life
Jaynesh was born to a former Vasantham stage singer and actor K. Isuran and mother V. Santhravathana. 

Jaynesh married Regina Raja in 2009 after being in a relationship since 1999. The couple has two sons.
Jaynesh now acts in international movies.

Television

Awards and nominations

References

External links

Living people
People from Singapore
Singaporean people of Tamil descent
Singaporean people of Indian descent
Singaporean actors
Tamil male television actors
Tamil television presenters
Tamil male actors
21st-century Tamil male actors
20th-century Tamil male actors
1988 births